The Industry and Business Party (INP) is a Norwegian political party founded at Vemork in Rjukan on 29 February 2020. The party describes itself as a centre-oriented moderate party, with the slogans "Stability and predictability", "Development, not liquidation" and will, among other things, work to prevent a restriction of the oil and gas industry and better framework conditions for business in general.

Party program and ideology 
The party program was drawn up based on proposals from members of the party's Facebook group.

INP calls itself a centre-oriented moderate party with values from both the right and left in the political landscape.

Electoral results 
The party collected the necessary 5,000 signatures from eligible Norwegians and was registered as a national political party by the Brønnøysund Register Centre on 6 May 2020. INP presented lists in all counties for the first time in the 2021 Norwegian parliamentary election.

Party leaders 
As of January 2023, Owe Ingemann Waltherzøe is the party leader and Line Kjos holds the position as deputy leader.

References 

Political parties in Norway
Political parties established in 2020